This is a list of notable individuals born in Venezuela of Lebanese ancestry or people of Lebanese and Venezuelan dual nationality who live or lived in Venezuela.

Business
 Carlos Lavaud - businessman
 Nelson Mezerhane- banker, owner of Diario Las Americas of Miami, Florida 
Alberto Raidi- businessman

Actress and singers
 Elizabeth Ayoub - singer, composer
 Dad Dager -  singer and actress
 Coraima Torres - actress.

Politicians
 Tareck El Aissami - politician
 Henry Ramos Allup - lawyer and politician
 Elías Jaua -  politician and former university professor
Abelardo Raidi- journalist
 Tarek William Saab - poet, lawyer and politician

Scientists
 Julian Chela-Flores, astrobiologist and physicist.

See also
List of Lebanese people
List of Lebanese people (Diaspora)

Venezuela
Lebanese

Lebanese